Ronit is both a Hindi and Hebrew given name. Notable people with the name include:

Hebrew given name
 Ronit Elkabetz (1964–2016), Israeli actress, screenwriter, and film director
 Ronit Lentin (born 1944), Israeli politician
 Ronit Matalon (1969–2017), Israeli fiction writer
 Ronit Tirosh (born 1953), Israeli politician

Hindi given name
 Ronit More (born 1992), Indian first-class cricketer
 Ronit Roy (born 1965), Indian actor